State Road 435 (SR 435), signed as Kirkman Road along its entire route, is a state highway in Florida, existing entirely within Orange County.  Kirkman Road is a major arterial on the west side of Orlando, and bounds the east side of Universal Orlando Resort.  It also connects on its south end into a Lockheed Martin research facility.

Route description
Kirkman Road begins at a trumpet interchange with Sand Lake Road. Not too long after, Kirkman Road intersects International Drive, followed by an interchange with Interstate 4 (I-4), and one of the entrances to Universal Orlando Resort. After this, Kirkman Road continues for another , passing by many hotels and resorts before its final major intersection with the tolled East–West Expressway, and then finally terminates at State Road 50 (Colonial Drive) soon after.

Major intersections

References

External links

435
435
435